The 1945 City of London by-election was held on 31 October 1945.  The by-election was held due to the elevation to hereditary peerage of the incumbent Conservative MP, George Broadbridge. It was won by the Conservative candidate and sitting Chairman of the Conservative Party Ralph Assheton who had lost Rushcliffe at the general election earlier in the year.

References

City of London by-election
Elections in the City of London
City of London by-election
City of London,1945